Three Points is a scenic, sparsely populated unincorporated community at the northwestern edge of Los Angeles County, in the northern Sierra Pelona Mountains foothills and southwest of the Antelope Valley in Southern California.

Geography
The settlement is on the northern edge of the Angeles National Forest, on the east side of Oakgrove Canyon where it opens out into Pine Canyon, 17.5 miles (28 km) north of Castaic.  Its elevation is 3,424 feet.

A roadside welcome sign said in 1991 that the Three Points population was 150. In 2008 a newer sign gave the population as 200.

— Los Angeles Times, June 16, 1991

History

1880s — 1970s
Three Points was homesteaded in 1892 by the Lafferty family, 83-year-old Laura May Lafferty told a reporter in 1991. Her grandmother acted as a midwife, and her father, Ben Cherbbono, was a French Canadian muleskinner who led a team that helped grade the Ridge Route highway in the early part of the 20th century. Gookins Lake in the area was named after her mother's family, she said.

In those days, Three Points was graced with a one-room schoolhouse, Pine Canyon School, where in 1953 Mrs. Lillie Knighton taught children aged 6 to 14; in midwinter, a “huge pot-bellied stove . . . hissed with heat.”
The school also acted as a community center; movies related to classwork were shown each Thursday night, open to adults.

Apart from the school, a tavern variously called the Three Point Cafe, Maxine's, and Nancy's Up the Road Cafe, was another center of social life. Bert Gookins was the first owner and builder — sometime in 1912, or maybe 1924, Bert Hart, Gookins’ grandson, recalled. It was a grocery store once, Hart said, and perhaps the restaurant and bar were added in the 1930s or 1940s. The building was occasionally occupied by a traveling dentist who used a foot-powered drill.

1980s on

Michael and Anita Felix bought the cafe in 1984 with the idea of using its park-like grounds for special events. Two years later, Anita had a heart attack and so the Felixes began leasing it to other operators.
When Maxine Martin had it in 1991 it was a combination bar, restaurant, social club and video-rental store featuring a decor that included

In November 1994 the Felixes resumed managing the cafe — but they opened it only on Saturdays and Sundays, and soon thereafter they put it up for sale.

In 2008 it was a private residence: An unusable gasoline pump in front was purely decorative, and the only sign of commerce was an outside vending machine that dispensed bottled water.

Government

As an unincorporated community, there is no local government, but there is a Three Points–Liebre Mountain Town Council, which in March 2009 was working on a community standards district document and on emergency preparedness.

Education
There is no longer a public school in the settlement. Three Points is part of the Westside Union School District of West Lancaster, which operates Del Sur, Joe Walker, Hill View, Cottonwood, Rancho Vista, Sundown, Valley View, Leona Valley, and Quartz Hill schools, through the eighth grade. 

The community is within the Antelope Valley Union High School District and the Antelope Valley Community College District.

Library
The Los Angeles County's public library sends its Antelope Valley bookmobile to Three Points from 9:30 to 11:30 a.m. one day a week.

Fire danger
Three Points was settled in a wooded valley shrouded in volatile pine trees, near a mountain fittingly named Burnt Peak, and the town has been threatened by wildfires many times over the decades. The earliest story about Three Points in the Los Angeles Times, the closest metropolitan newspaper to the settlement, is dated August 24, 1927, and, like many such articles thereafter, it was reporting on a massive fire in the forested area.

Twenty-two years later, in 1949, another fire in the canyon made the news:

 
In July 2004, the Times reported:

References

External links

Unincorporated communities in Los Angeles County, California
Sierra Pelona Ridge
Populated places established in 1892
1892 establishments in California
Unincorporated communities in California